Alfred Hammer was a West German bobsledder who competed in the late 1950s and the early 1960s. He won two medals in the four-man event at the FIBT World Championships with a gold in 1958 and a silver in 1960.

References
Bobsleigh four-man world championship medalists since 1930

German male bobsledders
Possibly living people
Year of birth missing